2017 Shenzhen Open – Doubles may refer to:

2017 ATP Shenzhen Open – Doubles
2017 WTA Shenzhen Open – Doubles
2017 Shenzhen Longhua Open – Men's Doubles
2017 Shenzhen Longhua Open – Women's Doubles

See also 

2017 Shenzhen Open (disambiguation)
2017 Shenzhen Longhua Open